Stood Up may refer to:

 "Stood Up" (song), a song by Ricky Nelson
 "Stood Up", a song by John Hiatt from Bring the Family

See also
 Stand Up (disambiguation)